Saýat is a city and capital of Saýat District in the Lebap Region of  Turkmenistan.

Etymology
Saýat is the name of a Turkmen tribe, and originally comes from the Arabic word for "hunter".

References

Populated places in Lebap Region